Medieval Times Dinner and Tournament is a family dinner theater featuring staged medieval-style games, sword-fighting, and jousting.  Medieval Times Entertainment, the holding company, is headquartered in Irving, Texas.

There are ten locations: the nine in the United States are built as replica 11th-century castles; the tenth, in Toronto, Ontario, Canada, is located inside the CNE Government Building.

History
The first two Medieval Times-styled shows were developed in the late 1960s by Jose Montaner in Spain at Majorca and Benidorm.  Montaner converted the barbecue restaurant on the family farm to entertainment and food venue where actors portrayed 11th-century jousting of knights of the northern Spanish and southern French kingdoms of Aragon, Navarre, and  Perelada (stories derived from Montaner's family history).  Montaner claims to be a descendent of Charlemagne. Accounts indicated that Tino Brana, who was involved in the jousting scenes from the 1961 film El Cid, was involved in staging the jousts.

In 1983 the Spanish investment group Manver (incorporated in the Netherlands Antilles) opened the first U.S. show at Orlando near Disney World.  In 1986 they opened their second establishment near Disneyland in California.  

In April 1997, the franchises in Florida and California sought bankruptcy protection after losing a court battle with the IRS that required the Buena Park location to pay  and the Orlando location to pay  in back taxes (equivalent to about $ and $M in ).  According to the IRS, Medieval Times improperly deducted royalties, loan interest, and management fees in the 1987 and 1989 tax years. When asked why the company was filing for bankruptcy the company's bankruptcy lawyer, Alan Friedman, said, "One of the primary reasons for filing was to prevent the IRS from beginning to seize any assets."

The chain was featured in the 1996 film The Cable Guy, and the 2004 feature film Garden State. It has been featured in episodes of TV shows such as Friends, Cake Boss, The Simpsons, Hell's Kitchen, The Celebrity Apprentice, and Close Enough.

The shows change about every six years. A new show premiered in late 2017; and, for the first time, the lead role was filled by a queen rather than a king.

On May 31, 2022, employees at Medieval Times in New Jersey filed for a union election with the NLRB, working with the American Guild of Variety Artists. In November 2022, employees at the Buena Park location also won a union election 27-18 to join the American Guild of Variety Artists, and initiated a strike soon after in February 2023 over pay and safety concerns.

Jose's son Perico Montaner is now the President and CEO of the private company, which is headquartered in Irving, Texas.

Locations

United States
 Orlando Castle (1983, Kissimmee, Florida)
 Buena Park Castle (1986, Buena Park, California)
 Lyndhurst Castle (1990, Lyndhurst, New Jersey)
 Chicago Castle, (1991, Schaumburg, Illinois)
 Dallas Castle (1992, Dallas, Texas)
 Myrtle Beach Castle (1995, Myrtle Beach, South Carolina)
 Baltimore Castle (2003, Hanover, Maryland)
 Atlanta Castle (2006, Lawrenceville, Georgia)
 Scottsdale Castle (2019, Scottsdale, Arizona)

Canada
 Toronto Castle (1993, Toronto, Ontario)

See also
 List of dinner theaters

References

External links
 
 

1983 establishments in Florida
Buena Park, California
companies based in Irving, Texas
companies that filed for Chapter 11 bankruptcy in 1997
dinner theatre
Lyndhurst, New Jersey
Medieval-themed fairs
restaurant chains in the United States
Schaumburg, Illinois
theatrical jousting
theme restaurants
tourist attractions in Atlanta
tourist attractions in Baltimore
tourist attractions in Bergen County, New Jersey
tourist attractions in Cook County, Illinois
tourist attractions in Dallas
tourist attractions in Myrtle Beach, South Carolina
tourist attractions in Orange County, California
tourist attractions in Orlando, Florida
tourist attractions in Toronto
Kissimmee, Florida